Spiritual Genocide is the twelfth studio album by German thrash metal band Destruction. It was released as a celebration of the band's 30th anniversary.

Background 
In August 2012, it was announced via Nuclear Blast website that Destruction had entered the studio to record their 13th album to celebrate their 30-year anniversary as a band.

Vocalist Marcel Schirmer commented:

Track listing 

All songs written by Schmier and Sifringer, except track 12 (written by Biff Byford, Graham Oliver, Paul Quinn, Steven Dawnson and Peter Gill) and track 14 (written by Lemmy Kilmister, Eddie Clarke and Phil Taylor).

Credits 
Writing, performance and production credits are adapted from the album liner notes.

Personnel 
Destruction
 Schmier – bass, lead vocals
 Mike Sifringer – guitars
 Wawrzyniec "Vaaver" Dramowicz – drums, backing vocals

Guest musicians
 Tom Angelripper – vocals on "Legacy of The Past"
 Andreas "Gerre" Geremia (Tankard) – vocals on "Legacy of the Past"
 Harry Wilkens – guitar solo on "Spiritual Genocide", "No Signs of Repentance", "Carnivore"; guitar on "Carnivore" (guest version)
 OL Drake – guitar solo on "Renegades", "Legacy of the Past", "Princess of the Night"
 Oliver "Olly" Kaiser – drums on "Carnivore" (guest version)

Additional musicians
 Tommy Sandmann – backing vocals on "Spiritual Genocide", "City of Doom"
 Harry Wilkens – backing vocals on "Spiritual Genocide", "City of Doom"
 Oliver "Olly" Kaiser – backing vocals on "Spiritual Genocide", "City of Doom"
 Sven Vormann – backing vocals on "Spiritual Genocide", "City of Doom"
 V.O. Pulver – backing vocals on "Spiritual Genocide", "City of Doom"
 Inga Pulver – backing vocals on "Spiritual Genocide", "City of Doom"
 Matthias "Metti" Room (Perzonal War) – backing vocals
 Björn Kluth (Perzonal War) – backing vocals

Production
 Destruction – production
 Martin Buchwalter – recording (drums and vocals)
 Mike Sifringer – recording (guitars and bass)
 Andy Classen – mixing, mastering

Artwork and design
 Gyula Havancsák – cover art
 Kai Swillus – photography

Studios 
 Gernhart Studios – recording (drums and vocals)
 Hail the Leaf Studio, Weil am Rhein, Germany – recording (guitars and bass)
 Stage One Studios – mixing, mastering

References

External links 
 
  Spiritual Genocide at Nuclear Blast

2012 albums
Destruction (band) albums